Ada Lois Sipuel Fisher (February 8, 1924 – October 18, 1995) was a key figure in the Civil Rights Movement in Oklahoma. She applied for admission into the University of Oklahoma law school in order to challenge the state's segregation laws and to become a lawyer.

Early life
Fisher was born six years before the lynching of Henry Argo in Chickasha, Oklahoma, to Rev. Travis Bruce Sipuel (1877–1946) and Martha Belle Smith (1885–1971). She graduated from Lincoln High School in 1941 as valedictorian. She enrolled in the Arkansas Agricultural, Mechanical & Normal College (now University of Arkansas at Pine Bluff), but transferred to Langston University in 1942. Ada Lois Sipuel, on March 2, 1944, in Chickasha, married Warren Washington Fisher (1916–1987). On May 21, 1945, she graduated from Langston, with honors.

Supreme Court case
Her brother, Lemuel Travis Sipuel (1921–1961), had planned to challenge segregationist policies of the University of Oklahoma, but went to Howard University Law School in Washington, D.C., to not delay his career further by protracted litigation.

Fisher, however, was willing to delay her legal career in order to challenge segregation. In 1946, she applied at the University of Oklahoma and was denied because of race. Two years later, in 1948, the United States Supreme Court ruled in Sipuel v. Board of Regents of Univ. of Okla. that the state of Oklahoma must provide instruction for blacks equal to that of whites. Thurgood Marshall acted as the head NAACP lawyer for this case and the justices ruled unanimously. The case was also a precursor for Brown v. Board of Education.

Legal education
In order to comply, the state of Oklahoma created the Langston University School of Law, located at the state capital. Further litigation was necessary to prove that this law school was inferior to the University of Oklahoma College of Law. Finally, on June 18, 1949, Sipuel was the first African-American admitted to the University of Oklahoma's law school. By this time, she was married and pregnant with the first of her two children. The law school gave her a chair marked "colored," and roped it off from the rest of the class. Despite this, her classmates and teachers welcomed her, shared their notes and studied with her, helping her to catch up on the materials she had missed.

 
Sipuel had to dine in a separate chained-off guarded area of the law school cafeteria. She recalled that years later some white students would crawl under the chain and eat with her when the guards were not around. Her lawsuit and tuition were supported by hundreds of small donations, and she believed she owed it to those donors to make it.

Later career
She graduated in 1951 with a Bachelor of Laws degree and began practicing law in her hometown of Chickasha in 1952.

In 1992, Oklahoma governor David Walters appointed her to the Board of Regents of the University of Oklahoma, which she noted in an interview, "completes a forty-five-year cycle." She further stated, "Having suffered severely from bigotry and racial discrimination as a student, I am sensitive to that kind of thing," and she planned to bring a new dimension to university policies.

Before her death in 1995, Fisher was a member of Alpha Kappa Alpha sorority and also was a professor at Langston University. She died of cancer, in Oklahoma City in October 1995.

In 1996 she was inducted posthumously in the Oklahoma Women's Hall of Fame. The University of Oklahoma dedicated the Ada Lois Sipuel Fisher Garden in her honor.

Family 
Ada Lois Sipuel, on March 2, 1944, in Chickasha, married Warren Washington Fisher (1916–1987), who was born in Paris, Texas, four years before the lynching of Irving and Herman Arthur. Her parents, Rev. Travis Bruce Sipuel and Martha Belle Sipuel, were survivors of the 1921 Tulsa Race Massacre. Their house was burned to the ground. They had moved from Dermott, Arkansas, to Tulsa around 1918 to help develop a congregation for the Church of God in Christ (COGIC) (Pentecostal). Sipuel rented a house in the Greenwood District on North Greenwood and leased a building for the North Greenwood COGIC. The building was located at 700 N. Greenwood (presently OSU Tulsa), on the North end of the thriving Black Wall Street. Sipuel helped grow the congregation to 40 during his time there.

See also 
 :Category:Tulsa race massacre (re: survivors)

Bibliography

Notes

References 

  ;  (hardback),  (e-book); ; .

  ; ; .

  ; ;  (book),  (article).
  ; ; .

  .

 

  ( – via TimesMachine).

 

 

   (publication);  (article).

External links
Ada Lois Sipuel Fisher Collection
Uncrowned Queens - Ada Lois Sipuel Fisher
Ada Lois Sipuel Fisher Collection (photographs) - Western History Collections, University of Oklahoma
Artwork in the Oklahoma State Senate
 Encyclopedia of Oklahoma History and Culture - Fisher, Ada Lois Sipuel
Voices of Oklahoma interview with Bruce Fisher about his mother Ada Lois Sipuel Fisher. First person interview conducted on July 2, 2015, with Bruce Fisher about his mother Ada Lois Sipuel Fisher. 
Voices of Oklahoma interview with Loretta Young Jackson. First person interview conducted on November 20, 2013, with Loretta Young Jackson, Ada Lois Sipuel Fisher was her mentor.

1924 births
1995 deaths
20th-century American lawyers
Activists from Oklahoma
American civil rights activists
Langston University alumni
Langston University faculty
Oklahoma lawyers
People from Chickasha, Oklahoma
School desegregation pioneers
University of Oklahoma College of Law alumni
American women lawyers
American lawyers
20th-century American women
Activists for African-American civil rights
American civil rights activists (civil rights movement)